6.0 may refer to:

 6.0, a numerical designation commonly used for computer software versioning
 6.0 (album), an album by Sister Machine Gun
 6.0 system, a judgement system used in competitive figure skating until 2005

See also
 6 (disambiguation)